Catherine Barrett (born June 19, 2000) is a Canadian artistic swimmer.

References 

Profile

2000 births
Living people
Canadian synchronized swimmers
Pan American Games gold medalists for Canada
Artistic swimmers at the 2019 Pan American Games
Pan American Games medalists in synchronized swimming
Artistic swimmers at the 2019 World Aquatics Championships
Medalists at the 2019 Pan American Games
21st-century Canadian women